"Cathy's Clown" is the first single from the album Hi Fi Way by Australian rock band, You Am I. It was released in 1995 and was the band's first single to reach the Australian Top 40 singles chart, peaking at number 36. It was listed at number 84 in the Triple J Hottest 100, 1995, an opinion poll of national radio station Triple J's listeners.

Track listing
 "Cathy's Clown" – 2:25
 "Hi-Way Fi" – 2:55
 "Gira E Respira" – 5:03
 "In the Street" – 2:03

"Hi-Way Fi" and "Gira E Respira" are You Am I originals (Tim Rogers), and the former track can be found on the Hi Fi Ways bonus live disc, Someone Else's Crowd. "In the Street" is a cover of Big Star's song, written by its members Chris Bell and Alex Chilton.

Charts

References

1995 singles
You Am I songs
1995 songs
Songs written by Tim Rogers (musician)
Songs written by Rusty Hopkinson
Songs written by Andy Kent